George Washington Minns (October 6, 1813 in Boston, Massachusetts – January 14, 1895 in Brookline, Massachusetts) graduated from Harvard College with the class of 1836 and received a law degree from the Howard Dane Law School of Harvard. He practiced law in Massachusetts for several years before moving to California. After the Gold Rush caused the collapse of his law practice and Minns lost all of his savings, he became a teacher at the Union Grammar School, the first California high school, and became principal of the Normal School the following year.  He was an  American teacher, notable for running the Minns Evening Normal School, which was established in San Francisco, California, in 1857 in order to train teachers for the city's public school system. His normal school, named the California State Normal School, was the first publicly funded institution of higher learning in the state. George Minns was principal of the school from 1857-1862 and 1865-1866. The California State Normal School was transferred to the State of California in 1862, and is now known as San José State University.

Business

1841 - Admitted to the Suffolk County bar.
1854 - Arrived in California after sailing around Cape Horn aboard the clipper ship Winged Arrow.
1855 - Practiced law in San Francisco, California.
1857-1862 - Principal of Minns Evening Normal School, the predecessor of the California State Normal School, which, in turn, became San José State University, a campus of the California State University system.
June, 1865-June, 1866 - Returns to principal of the California State Normal School.

Education
1836 - Harvard University
1838(?) - Bachelor of Laws, Howard Dane Law School

References

External links
A short biographical sketch of George W. Minns.
A brief historiographical list of Minns' accomplishments

1813 births
1895 deaths
Harvard University alumni
Schoolteachers from California
Lawyers from Boston
San Jose State University
19th-century American lawyers
19th-century American educators